Cyperus nutans is a sedge of the family Cyperaceae that is native to Australia, China, India, Bangladesh, south-east Asia, Malaysia, India, and Indonesia.

The culms are three sided with sharp edges and concave sides. It blooms between February and July and produces brown flowers. After flowering a dark brown narrow-ellipsoid to narrow-obovoid shaped nut will form.

The species was first formally described by the botanist Martin Vahl in 1805 as part of the work Enumeratio Plantarum, from a specimen collected in India. The only two subspecies are Cyperus nutans subsp. nutans and Cyperus nutans var. nutans.

The plant is found in northern and eastern Australia in coastal areas in the states of New South Wales, Queensland, Northern Territory and Western Australia. In Western Australia it is found around shady swamps and pools in the Kimberley region where it grows in sandy-clay soils. In New South Wales it is only found in the north-eastern corner where it is found along creek banks.

See also
List of Cyperus species

References

External links 

 Cyperus nutans occurrence data from GBIF
Cyperus nutans occurrence data from the Australasian Virtual Herbarium

Plants described in 1805
Flora of Western Australia
nutans